Eddy Voordeckers (born 4 February 1960) is a Belgian former professional footballer who played as forward.

Honours 
Standard Liège
 Belgian First Division: 1981–82
 Belgian Cup: 1980–81
 Belgian Super Cup: 1981 European Cup Winners' Cup: runner-up 1981–82
 Intertoto Cup Group Winners: 1980, 1982Gent Second Division play-off winner: 1988–89Individual'''
 European Cup Winners Cup top scorer: 1981–82 (six goals)

References

External links
 

1960 births
Living people
Belgian footballers
Association football forwards
Belgium international footballers
Ligue 1 players
K.F.C. Diest players
Standard Liège players
K. Waterschei S.V. Thor Genk players
Stade Rennais F.C. players
K.A.A. Gent players
K.V.C. Westerlo players
UEFA Euro 1984 players
Belgian expatriate footballers
Belgian expatriate sportspeople in France
Expatriate footballers in France
People from Geel
Footballers from Antwerp Province